Vladimir Nikolaevich Markin (born 8 May 1959, Korolyov, Moscow Oblast, USSR) is a Russian pop singer, entrepreneur, composer, songwriter.

From 2012 he was a member of the municipal Assembly District Vykhino-Zhulebino in Moscow from   Communist Party of the Russian Federation, although he was not a member of the party.

He occupied the position of director of the Palace of Culture Moscow Power Engineering Institute.

References

External links
 Официальный сайт
 

1959 births
Living people
People from Korolyov, Moscow Oblast
Soviet male singers
Soviet composers
Soviet male composers
Russian composers
Russian male composers
Soviet television presenters
Russian television presenters
Russian businesspeople
Russian pop musicians
Russian pop singers
Soviet pop singers
Patriots of Russia politicians
20th-century Russian male singers
20th-century Russian singers
Entertainment industry businesspeople